The Friars are four steep dolerite rocks, with a combined area of about , in south-eastern Australia. They are part of the Actaeon Island Group, lying close to the south-eastern coast of Tasmania, at the southern entrance to the D'Entrecasteaux Channel between Bruny Island and the mainland. They form part of South Bruny National Park.

Fauna
Recorded breeding seabird species are the little penguin, short-tailed shearwater, fairy prion and common diving-petrel. The metallic skink is present. Australian fur seals, and possibly New Zealand fur seals, use the rocks as a regular haul-out site.

References

Islands of South East Tasmania
South Bruny National Park